USS Constellation may refer to: 

, was a 38-gun frigate launched in 1797 and scrapped in 1853 
, is a sloop-of-war launched in 1854 and decommissioned in 1933, and preserved as a National Historic Landmark in Baltimore, Maryland 
, was a battlecruiser laid down in 1920 and had construction cancelled in 1923
, will be the lead ship of her class of guided missile frigates

United States Navy ship names